"That's What I Like" is a song by British novelty pop music act Jive Bunny and the Mastermixers, released on 2 October 1989 as the second single from their debut album, The Album (1989). It followed "Swing the Mood" to number one in the United Kingdom, Ireland and Spain and went top ten in several countries. In the United States, it failed to build on the success of the group's first hit, peaking at number 69 on the Billboard Hot 100.

Background and structure
Father and son team Andy and John Pickles repeated the formula which had taken their record "Swing the Mood" to number one a few months previously. This time using "Hawaii Five-O" by the Ventures from the TV series Hawaii Five-O as the recurring melodic hook in the record. It was the act's second UK number-one hit and stayed at the top for three weeks in October 1989.

The mix includes the following songs:
 "Theme from Hawaii Five-O" by the Ventures
 "Let's Twist Again" by Chubby Checker
 "Let's Dance" by Chris Montez
 "Wipeout" by the Surfaris
 "Great Balls of Fire" by Jerry Lee Lewis
 "Johnny B. Goode" by Chuck Berry
 "Good Golly Miss Molly" by Little Richard
 "The Twist" by Chubby Checker
 "Summertime Blues" by Eddie Cochran
 "Razzle Dazzle" by Bill Haley and the Comets
 "Runaround Sue" by Dion
 "Chantilly Lace" by the Big Bopper

Critical reception
Selina Webb from Music Week wrote, "Same formula, different faves, and still infuriatingly hitbound. An archive "C'mon everybody" kicks off snatches of the Hawaii 5-O theme tune plus geriatric hits from Chubby Checker, Little Richard and Bill Haley. Hands up if you wish you'd thought of it first."

Track listings
 7-inch single
 "That's What I Like" – 4:03
 "Pretty Blue Eyes" by John Anderson Band – 2:44

 12-inch maxi
 "That's What I Like" (extended twist mix) – 5:23
 "Pretty Blue Eyes" by John Anderson Band – 2:44
 "Twelve Bar Thingy" by John Anderson Band – 2:39

 CD maxi
 "That's What I Like" – 4:03
 "That's What I Like" (extended twist mix) – 5:23
 "Pretty Blue Eyes" – 2:44
 "Twelve Bar Thingy" by John Anderson Band – 2:39

Personnel
 Artwork by Mick Hand
 Edited and engineered by Andy Pickles and Ian Morgan
 Executive producer : John Pickles
 Produced by Les Hemstock

Charts

Weekly charts

Year-end charts

Certifications and sales

References

1989 songs
1989 singles
Jive Bunny and the Mastermixers songs
Irish Singles Chart number-one singles
Number-one singles in Spain
UK Singles Chart number-one singles